Ramón Rivera (born 14 December 1959) is a Puerto Rican former cyclist. He competed in the individual road race event at the 1984 Summer Olympics.

References

1959 births
Living people
Puerto Rican male cyclists
Olympic cyclists of Puerto Rico
Cyclists at the 1984 Summer Olympics
Place of birth missing (living people)